The 1984 Gilbey's Gin Tonics season was the 6th season of the franchise in the Philippine Basketball Association (PBA).

Transactions

Occurrences
In early 1984, when the multi-titled popular ballclub Toyota Super Corollas started their disbandment procedures. Gilbey's Gin team owner and PBA president Carlos "Honeyboy" Palanca apparently had already expressed his desire to enlist the services of Robert "the Big J" Jaworski. Toyota team manager Jack Rodriguez, however, said that all player contracts of the Super Corollas were sold by management to Beer Hausen, including the Big J. In a shocking revelation, league officials, led by PBA commissioner Mariano Yenko and his legal counsel Atty. Rodrigo Salud, bared that Jaworski's contract was not really acquired by Shareholdings Inc. the holding company of Beer Hausen and the one that bought the Toyota franchise, and that Big J was committed to play for Gilbey's Gin. Jaworski, along with three other Toyota players namely; Francis Arnaiz, Chito Loyzaga and Arnie Tuadles, refused to play for Beer Hausen. In an official statement, Gilbey's owner Carlos Palanca said they will be able to accommodate Francis Arnaiz, but have to drop Loyzaga and Tuadles, because the team already has a complete backcourt lineup.

Finals stint
Gilbey's defeated newcomer Beer Hausen in a playoff game on July 5 to enter the finals against defending champion Crispa, their last year's finals opponent in the same conference. The Gin Tonics placed runner-up to Crispa Redmanizers in the first of the two All-Filipino conferences of the year, losing 1-4 in the best-of-seven finals series.

Won-loss records vs Opponents

Roster

Subtraction

References

External links
 Gilbey's team photo@interbasket.net

Barangay Ginebra San Miguel seasons
Gilbey's Gin